Hallen may refer to:

 Hallen Court District, Sweden
 Hallen, Gloucestershire, England
 Hallen, Sweden, in Åre Municipality, Jämtland County
 Hallen A.F.C., a football club in Hallen, England
 Hallen (surname), an English surname

See also
 Halen, a municipality in Limburg, Belgium
 Hallein, a town in the Austrian state of Salzburg
 Hallen derrick, a lifting device